The 1921–22 Plunket Shield season was a tournament of the Plunket Shield, the domestic first-class cricket competition of New Zealand.

Auckland won the championship. For the first time, the Shield was not contested on the basis of challenge matches but by a single round-robin tournament between four first-class sides, Auckland, Canterbury, Otago and Wellington. Hawke's Bay, which had had first-class status and had challenged Auckland for the Plunket Shield in 1920-21, did not compete.

Table

Statistics

Most runs
Syd Hiddleston, opening the batting for Wellington, scored the most runs, 308, had the highest batting average, 61.60, and made the only century, 118 against Otago.

Most wickets
Raoul Garrard, the Auckland leg-spinner, took the most wickets, 23 at an average of 10.34, and had the best figures, 8 for 51 against Canterbury.

External links
 Final table at Cricket Archive

References

Plunket Shield
Plunket Shield